The Irpinian dialect, or Irpino, is the dialect of Neapolitan language spoken in almost all of the comuni in the Province of Avellino in the Italian region of Campania. It differs from other varieties in certain phrases, pronunciation and the use of definite articles. The dialect is heavily influenced by its geographical neighbours. For example, in the northern area of Avellino, there are some undertones of the Beneventan dialect; and the Arianese dialect, spoken in Ariano Irpino along the border with Apulia, has distinct Pugliese influences.

Dialects of Neapolitan
Province of Avellino